Florence Descampe (born 1 September 1969) is a veteran professional golfer from Brussels, Belgium who played on the United States-based LPGA Tour and the Ladies European Tour.

Career 
Descampe had seven worldwide victories during her career including a win at the 1992 McCall's LPGA Classic on the LPGA Tour. Until Paula Creamer's win at the 2005 Evian Masters, she held the record as the LET's youngest winner after clinching the 1988 Danish Ladies Open.

Descampe was a member of the 1992 European Solheim Cup team.

Personal life 
She was born into the noble Descampe family and is a member of the Van Dievoet family through her marriage with Daniel van Dievoet (1963-2011), with whom she had three children: Élodie, a student-athlete golfer at the University of Michigan, Maxence, and Alban.

Professional wins (7)

LPGA Tour (1)

Ladies European Tour (6) 
1988 (1) Danish Ladies Open
1990 (3) Valextra Classic, Italian Ladies' Open, Woolmark Ladies' Matchplay
1991 (1) Lufthansa Ladies' German Open
1994 (1) OVB Damen Open Austria

Team appearances
Professional
Solheim Cup (representing Europe): 1992 (winners)

References 

Belgian female golfers
Ladies European Tour golfers
LPGA Tour golfers
Solheim Cup competitors for Europe
Sportspeople from Brussels
Van Dievoet family
1969 births
Living people